S S Kumar is an Indian businessman and the former chairman of the Council for Leather Exports.

Early life and education
Sir S. S. Kumar was born in Kolkata.  He studied in the National High Schools and obtained his graduation in commerce and law from Calcutta University. He also holds a diploma in Textile technology.

Awards Received By Sir Kumar
The Italian Government awarded Kumar with the Knighthood of the order of the Star of Italian Solidarity in 2006.

Books Written By Sir Kumar 
Silhouettes of Sundarban 
Darjeeling Queen of the hills 
Frozen waves Publisher Leadstart Corp.

References

Living people
Businesspeople from Kolkata
University of Calcutta alumni
1952 births